Saint Savina (died 311) was a Milanese martyr under Diocletian. Her feast day is the 30th of January. She gave aid to Christian prisoners and also ensured that they received proper burials after their executions, and for this reason she was martyred. Tradition states that she died while praying at the tomb of Saints Nabor and Felix.

References

External links

Savina at Patron Saints Index
St. Patrick Catholic Church Saint of the Day: January 30

311 deaths
4th-century Christian martyrs
4th-century Roman women
Year of birth unknown